This is a list of Australia-New Guinea species extinct in the Holocene that covers extinctions from the Holocene epoch, a geologic epoch that began about 11,650 years before present (about 9700 BCE) and continues to the present day.

The Australian continent is also called Australia-New Guinea or Sahul to avoid confusion with the country of Australia. The continent includes mainland Australia, Tasmania, the island of New Guinea, the Aru Islands, the Ashmore and Cartier Islands, most of the Coral Sea Islands, and some other nearby islands. The country of Australia includes mainland Australia and Tasmania, while the island of New Guinea is divided between the country of Papua New Guinea and Indonesian Western New Guinea. The Aru Islands are also part of Indonesia. Extinct animals from the rest of Indonesia are covered in List of Asian animals extinct in the Holocene. However, species from the outlying islands of the country of Australia and Papua New Guinea are included below.  

The fauna of Australia-New Guinea is very unique. Marsupials and monotremes also existed on other continents, but only in Australia-New Guinea did they out-compete the placental mammals and come to dominate. Aside from marine mammals, only two orders of placental mammals are native to Australia-New Guinea: rodents and bats. Dingoes and New Guinea singing dogs are considered feral dogs (Canis familiaris) introduced by humans. The Christmas Island shrew is related to Asian shrews; no members of the order Eulipotyphla are native to Australia-New Guinea proper.  

New Zealand species extinct in the Holocene are listed separately. The fauna of New Zealand is distinct from Australia-New Guinea. Birds, including numerous flightless birds, are the most important part of New Zealand's vertebrate fauna. Bats are New Zealand's only native land mammals.

Numerous species have disappeared from Australia-New Guinea as part of the ongoing Holocene extinction, driven by human activity. Most Australian megafauna disappeared in the Late Pleistocene, considerably earlier than in other continental landmasses. As a result, Australian Holocene extinctions generally are of modest size. Most extinctions occurred after the European settlement of Australia, which began with the First Fleet in 1788 CE. However, the thylacine (Thylacinus cynocephalus) was extirpated from New Guinea around 3050 BCE and mainland Australia around 1277-1229 BCE. The Norfolk swamphen and several Papuan mammals also disappeared before European colonisation.

Mammals (class Mammalia)

Order Dasyuromorphia

Thylacine (family Thylacinidae)

Bandicoots and bilbies (order Peramelemorphia)

Bandicoots (family Peramelidae)

Bilbies (family Thylacomyidae)

Pig-footed bandicoots (family Chaeropodidae)

Order Diprotodontia

Brushtail possums and cuscuses (family Phalangeridae)

Possibly extinct

Trioks, striped possum, Leadbeater's possum, and wrist-winged gliders (family Petauridae)

Ring-tailed possums and allies (family Pseudocheiridae)

Macropods (family Macropodidae)

Bettongs, potoroos, and rat-kangaroos (family Potoroidae)

Rodents (order Rodentia)

Murids (family Muridae)

Possibly extinct, murids (family Muridae)

Order Eulipotyphla

True shrews (family Soricidae)

Possibly extinct

Bats (order Chiroptera)

Megabats (family Pteropodidae)

Possibly extinct, megabats (family Pteropodidae)

Vesper bats (family Vespertilionidae)

Birds (class Aves)

Cassowaries and emus (order Casuariformes)

Cassowaries and emus (family Casuariidae)

Pigeons and doves (order Columbiformes)

Pigeons and doves (family Columbidae)

Rails and cranes (order Gruiformes)

Rails (family Rallidae)

Boobies, cormorants, and allies (order Suliformes)

Cormorants and shags (family Phalacrocoracidae)

Owls (order Strigiformes)

True owls (family Strigidae)

Parrots (order Psittaciformes)

Kea and kākā (family Nestoridae)

Old World parrots (family Psittaculidae)

Perching birds (order Passeriformes)

Pittas (family Pittidae)

Bristlebirds (family Dasyornithidae)

Australian warblers (family Acanthizidae)

Cuckooshrikes and allies (family Campephagidae)

Australasian wrens (family Maluridae)

Fantails and silktails (family Rhipiduridae)

Australasian robins (family Petroicidae)

White-eyes (family Zosteropidae)

Possibly extinct, white-eyes (family Zosteropidae)

Thrushes (family Turdidae)

Starlings (family Sturnidae)

Reptiles (class Reptilia)

Squamates (order Squamata)

Skinks (family Scincidae)

Extinct in the wild, skinks (family Scincidae)

Common geckos (family Gekkonidae)

Extinct in the wild

Dragon lizards (family Agamidae)

Possibly extinct

Amphibians (class Amphibia)

Frogs (order Anura)

Australian ground frogs (family Myobatrachidae)

Treefrogs and allies (family Hylidae)

Ray-finned fish (class Actinopterygii)

Anglerfish (order Lophiiformes)

Handfish (family Brachionichthyidae)

Data deficient

Galaxias (order Galaxiiformes)

Galaxias (family Galaxiidae)

Extinct in the wild

Insects (class Insecta)

Beetles (order Coleoptera)

Predaceous diving beetles (family Dytiscidae)

Molluscs (phylum Mollusca)

Gastropods (class Gastropoda)

Order Stylommatophora

Family Bothriembryontidae

Family Achatinellidae

Segmented worms (phylum Annelida)

Clitellates (class Clitellata)

Order Opisthopora

Family Megascolecidae

Plants (kingdom Plantae)

See also
Fauna of Australia
Threatened fauna of Australia
Lazarus taxon
List of New Zealand species extinct in the Holocene
List of Hawaiian animals extinct in the Holocene
List of Oceanian animals extinct in the Holocene
List of recently extinct mammals
List of extinct bird species since 1500
Lists of extinct species

Notes

References

Department of Environment, Water, Heritage and the Arts. EPBC Act List of Threatened Fauna
World Conservation Union, IUCN Red List of Threatened Species 2006

Extinct animals of Australia
†Extinct
Australia
Australia